Tahtakuşlar Ethnography Museum is a private museum in Balıkesir Province, Turkey devoted to the lifestyle of villagers of Oghuz Turks origin.

Tahtakuşlar is a village in Edremit ilçe (district) of Balıkesir Province. The visitors follow İzmir-Çanakkale highway  up to the town of Güre. The museum is situated just  from Güre.

The museum was founded on 10 June 1991 by Alibey Kudar, a retired primary school teacher. The population of the village is composed of Oghuz Turks, who are locally known as Tahtacı, and the museum is devoted to Tahtacı culture. Some of the exhibited items are household furniture, local attire, rugs, tents, amulets, ornament, etc. The art gallery of painter and sculptor Selim Turan was added to the local collection in 1992, and a library was established within the museum in 1994.

References

External links
Youtube file

Ethnographic museums in Turkey
Edremit, Balıkesir
Oghuz Turks
Museums in Balıkesir Province
Art museums and galleries in Turkey
Libraries in Turkey